Padjelanta is a national park in Norrbotten County in northern Sweden.

Etymology and the presence of the Sámi people 
The name of the park derives from the Lule Sami word Badjelánnda, which translates to the higher land – a straightforward description of the region. Today the three Sámi villages Duorbun, Jåhkågasska and Sirges let their reindeer graze in Padjelanta in the summer, using the traditional settlements of Stáloluokta, Árasluokta and Sállohávrre. The National Park contains Bronze Age rock carvings.

Nature 
The park, which borders on Norway in the west, is primarily comprised by a vast plateau around the two unusually large lakes Vastenjávrre and Virihávrre – the latter of which is often referred to as "the most beautiful lake in Sweden". Consequently, the landscape is fairly flat and open, especially compared to the alpine Sarek National Park on its eastern border, and mainly consists of rolling hills with few peaks of the higher variety.

Plants 
Most of the park is situated above the tree line; meaning few species of trees can survive the harsh climate of the park. The exposure of strong winds and the cold winters has made it so that the only tree that can exist in any relevant numbers is the small and robust Betula pubescens subsp. tortuosa (mountain birch). These form a small forest of 1,400 hectares or 3,500 acres) in the northeast corner of the park.
The diversity of the flora is extremely high, nonetheless: over 400 different lower plant (thallophytes) species have been cataloged in the area, which reportedly is a record in the Swedish fells (highlands). This is due to its western position and chalk-rich bedrock. Some of these species, such as Arenaria humifusa and Gentiana aurea, can only be found in the Swedish fell regions and Potentilla robbinsiana is a plant that, in Europe, has only ever been found in Padjelanta.

Animals 
Padjelelanta hosts a very limited number of mammals, with a low variety of different species, almost all of which have small populations. The mammals that do exist are mostly lemmings and reindeer, as well as the predators that eat them; in this case the wolverine and the Arctic fox, respectively, both being permanently resident in the park.

Padjelanta's bird-life however is very rich and showcases most species associated with the Swedish bare mountain fell – and fell lake regions.
The most typical species on the heath are European golden plover, meadow pipit and northern wheatear but rock ptarmigan, Eurasian dotterel and Eurasian whimbrel are also fairly common sights.

In and around the lakes there are plenty of Anatinae, such as long-tailed duck, Eurasian teal and common scoter as well as many waders, which include red-necked phalarope, ruff, Temminck's stint and common redshank.

The northeast forest is also home to a great variety of species and contains an abundance of common redpoll, willow warbler, Lapland longspur, bluethroat and redwing.

Then there are also many birds that are not really constricted to one area but is spread throughout the park. This include lesser white-fronted goose, gyrfalcon, golden eagle, white-tailed eagle, great snipe, rough-legged buzzard and long-tailed jaeger. During lemming-years you can even see the snowy owl which is otherwise rare seen in Padjelanta.

The park also contains a rich quantity of fish, Vastenjávrre and Virihávrre being especially densely populated.

History 
Padjelanta, due to its flourishing meadows and fish filled lakes has long been attractive to humans and the park has been inhabited ever since the Stone Age (one evidence of this being the many trapping pits that have been found and dated back to this period of time). Even today the lakes are utilized for fishing by the Sámi villages.
Ever since the birth of modern science the area has also been interesting for scientists, mainly for studying its flora, fauna and geology.

Tourism 
There is a well-known hiking trail called Padjelantaleden (Padjelanta Trail) that runs between Kvikkjokk in the southeast and either Vaisaluokta or Änonjalme beneath Áhkká in the north, and is about 140 km in length. All these endpoints lie outside the borders of the park, which means that hikers must travel for at least a day before entering Padjelanta itself, but in the summer there are also regular helicopter tours between Kvikkjokk, Stáloluokta and Ritsem.

Along this trail there are a number of cottage sites providing accommodation for visitors. Originally, the tourist buildings within the park proper were managed by the Swedish Environmental Protection Agency, but they have since passed into the care of the aforementioned Sámi villages, under the name Badjelánnda Laponia Turism (BLT). The other cottages on the trail are maintained by the Swedish Tourist Association (STF). In Stáloluokta there is a sauna, and during the tourist season visitors can also buy provisions there.

Note that Padjelantaleden is a summer trail, so there are no markings visible when the land is covered in snow. Neither are the cottages manned in winter, but there is always at least one room open at all the cottage sites.

Another hiking trail called Nordkalottruta also passes through the park, although its path is the same as that of Padjelantaleden most of the way.

Another point of interest is that the Swedish center of inaccessibility (i.e. the point where one is at a maximum distance from civilization) lies in Padjelanta.

Notes

References

External links 

 Sweden's National Parks: Padjelanta National Park from the Swedish Environmental Protection Agency
 Badjelánnda Laponia Turism Information about the cottage sites in the park (Swedish/German)
 Norbottensfjällen from the County Administration of Norrbotten

National parks of Sweden
Geography of Norrbotten County
Protected areas established in 1962
1962 establishments in Sweden
Tourist attractions in Norrbotten County
Lapland (Sweden)